Charles Ernest Higginbotham (4 July 1866 in Charing Cross, Glasgow, Lanarkshire, Scotland – 11 March 1915 in France) was a British soldier who also had a notable cricket career.

Biography

After attending Rugby School and the Royal Military College, Sandhurst, Higginbotham was commissioned a second lieutenant in the Northamptonshire Regiment on 5 February 1887. He was promoted to lieutenant on 16 April 1890, and stationed in the Far East, where he played cricket for the Straits Settlements, playing three matches against Hong Kong between 1890 and 1891.

Following promotion to captain on 2 January 1899, he served during the Second Boer War in South Africa, and was Superintendent of Gymnasia until July 1902, when he returned to his regiment. He took part in some Minor Counties cricket for Devon in the first years of the 20th century. Whilst stationed in South Africa after the end of the Boer war, he made his first-class debut in January 1906, playing for the South African Army against the touring Marylebone Cricket Club (MCC) team, who were in fact the touring England cricket team.

He played one further first-class match, playing for the Army against the Royal Navy at Lord's in May 1912. He was killed on active service at the Battle of Neuve Chapelle in March 1915.

References

1866 births
1915 deaths
People educated at Cargilfield School
People educated at Rugby School
Northamptonshire Regiment officers
British Army personnel of the Second Boer War
British Army personnel of World War I
British military personnel killed in World War I
English cricketers
Straits Settlements cricketers
Devon cricketers
British Army cricketers
Graduates of the Royal Military College, Sandhurst
Military personnel from Glasgow